Adebayo Oladapo (born 28 August 1940) is a Nigerian sprinter. He competed in the men's 4 × 100 metres relay at the 1960 Summer Olympics.

References

External links
 
 

1940 births
Living people
Nigerian male sprinters
Olympic athletes of Nigeria
Athletes (track and field) at the 1958 British Empire and Commonwealth Games
Athletes (track and field) at the 1960 Summer Olympics
Sportspeople from Ibadan
Commonwealth Games competitors for Nigeria
20th-century Nigerian people